Jules Auguste Demersseman (9 January 1833 – 1 December 1866) was a French flautist and composer.

Biography 

Demersseman was born in Hondschoote, Département Nord, France, near the Belgian border. At 11, he was a student of Jean-Louis Tulou at the Conservatoire de Paris. He won the first prize there at the age of twelve and quickly became famous as a virtuoso. However, he was not considered for a professorship, since he, influenced by his teacher, did not favor the modern type of transverse flute designed by Theobald Böhm which had been introduced into France in the meantime. Demersseman was only 33 when he died in Paris, presumably from tuberculosis.

Works 

Demersseman wrote numerous works for his own instrument, the flute. Probably the best known of his works today is the Solo de Concert, Op. 82 No. 6. This piece, also known as the "Italian Concerto", uses a Neapolitan folk melody in the middle movement and closes with a saltarello. In addition to his works for flute, Demersseman was one of the first French composers to write music for the newly developed saxophone. He wrote a Fantasy for the saxophone and piano.

Media

Sources and further information

Literature 

 Pešek, U., Pešek, Ž.: Flötenmusik aus drei Jahrhunderten. Bärenreiter 1990. 
 Goldberg, A.: Porträts und Biographien hervorragender Flöten-Virtuosen, -Dilettanten und -Komponisten. Moeck 1987 (Reprint of 1906).

External links
 
 

1833 births
1866 deaths
People from Nord (French department)
French male classical composers
French Romantic composers
French classical flautists
19th-century classical composers
Conservatoire de Paris alumni
19th-century deaths from tuberculosis
19th-century French composers
19th-century French male musicians
Tuberculosis deaths in France
20th-century flautists